Oriental Star may refer to:

MV Oriental Star, or Dong Fang Zhi Xing, Chinese ship
Oriental Star Agencies,  British based record label